is a J-pop singer who is signed to Geneon Universal Entertainment. She is a former member of the music production group I've Sound based in Sapporo, Japan. She has performed several songs for eroge together with the other I've Sound members. In August 2007, she released her first maxi single under Geneon Universal Entertainment titled "Shining Stars Bless," which was used as the opening theme for the anime Nanatsuiro Drops.

In 2013, it was announced that Utatsuki will leave I've Sound after the release of her album Going On on March 20, 2013.

Discography

Singles

Mini-albums

Songs in I've

Solo
 Senecio (Stokesia) (released July 25, 2002)
 Sway (released December 28, 2002)
 Kienai Omoi (消えない想い) (released June 20, 2003)
 Kienai Omoi (消えない想い) Album Mix (released November 27, 2003)
 Lemonade (レモネード) (released November 27, 2003)
 Senecio: Album Mix (released November 27, 2003)
 Pure Heart: Sekai de Ichiban Anata ga Suki Remix (Pure Heart: 世界で一番アナタが好き Remix) (released November 27, 2003)
 Do You Know the Magic? (Opening for 魔法はあめいろ?) (released December 3, 2004)
 Cross Talk: Fish Tone Style (released December 29, 2004)
 Anata ga Suki (あなたが好き) (released April 21, 2005)
 Naisho Naisho (ナイショ★Naiしょ) (released August 26, 2005)
 Open (Ending Theme for Tsuyokiss - CoolxSweet) (released August 23, 2006)
 Anata dake no Angel (アナタだけのAngel☆) (Ending Theme for AneImo Second Stage) (released April 27, 2007)
 I'm Home (from Short Circuit II) (released June 22, 2007)
 Jet Smash! (Opening Theme for Ero Smash!) (released July 27, 2007)
 Love Is Money?! (Opening Theme for Shakkin Shimai 2) (released June 27, 2008)
 Change of Heart (Soyuz Project Remix) (released September 24, 2008)
 Shiroi Rinbukyoku (白い輪舞曲) (Ending Theme for Fuyu no Rondo) (released October 31, 2008)
 Soyokaze no Yukue (Front Line Covers ver.) (そよ風の行方) (released December 28, 2008)
 One Small Day (Front Line Covers ver.) (released December 28, 2008)
 Dream to New World (Front Line Covers ver.) (released December 28, 2008)
  (released March 25, 2009)
 Eien, chiisana hikari (永遠～小さな光～) (released February 16, 2011)
 Nijiiro Rock & Roll (★虹色ロックンロール♪) (Opening for つよきす３学期) (released March 31, 2011)
 Face of Fact Tribal Link version (released July 29, 2011)
 The Maze Tribal Link version (released July 29, 2011)
 Hold on Me: koi no mahou (Hold on Me ～恋の魔法～) (Opening for ラブライド・イヴ) (released August 26, 2011)

Kotoko & Kaori Utatsuki
 Bokura ga Mimamoru Mirai (僕らが見守る未来) (released September 20, 2002)
 Kimi to Yume wo Shinjite (君と夢を信じて) (released June 28, 2002)
 Watashi wa Uta ga Eta (ワタシはウタがヘタ) (released November 29, 2002) (non-I've)
 Watashi wa Uta ga Eta Dakedo (ワタシはウタがヘタだけど) (released November 29, 2002) (non-I've)
 Save Your Heart: Album mix (released September 5, 2003)
 Natsukusa no Senro: Album mix (夏草の線路 Album Mix) (released September 5, 2003)
 Ren'ai Chuu!: Remix (恋愛Chu！Remix) (released November 27, 2003)
 Seishun Rocket: Short Circuit II Edit (↑青春ロケット↑: Short Circuit II Edit) (released June 22, 2007)
 Crash Course: Koi no Tokubetsu Lesson (Crash Course: 恋の特別レッスン) (released December 19, 2008)

Albums in I've
 Dirty Gift (released December 29, 2002)
 I've Girls Compilation Vol.4 "Lament" (released October 30, 2003)
 I've Girls Compilation Vol.5 "Out Flow" (released October 30, 2003)
 Short Circuit (released November 27, 2003)
 Mixed Up (released December 29, 2004)
 I've Girls Compilation Vol.6 "Collective" (released September 30, 2005)
 Short Circuit II (released June 22, 2007)
 Master Groove Circle (released September 24, 2008)
 The Front Line Covers (released December 28, 2008)
 I've Sound 10th Anniversary Departed to the Future Special CD BOX (released March 25, 2009)

I've Special Unit
 "See You" Chiisana Eien (～小さな永遠～, Chīsana Eien) (P.V ver.) (released September 5, 2003)
 "Fair Heaven" (released July 30, 2005)
 "Tenjou wo Kakeru Monotachi (天壌を翔る者たち) (performed as Love Planet Five) (released April 4, 2007)

References

External links
 Kaori Utatsuki's Geneon Web Site 
 I've Sound's official website 

Anime musicians
Year of birth missing (living people)
Living people
NBCUniversal Entertainment Japan artists
Japanese women singers
I've Sound members
Hayate the Combat Butler
Musicians from Sapporo